Arthur Edwin Boycott FRS (6 April 1877, Hereford — 12 May 1938, Ewen) was a British pathologist and naturalist. 
While studying blood sedimentation he discovered that when test tubes are slightly tilted, sedimentation takes place at a much higher rate.
The effect, named after him "the Boycott effect", plays a major role in the phenomenon of the sinking bubbles in Guinness stout beer.

On 8 December 2016, it was reported that a book that Boycott borrowed from Hereford Cathedral School sometime between 1886 and 1894 was returned to the school by his granddaughter Alice Gillett.

References 

1877 births
1938 deaths
Fellows of the Royal Society
People educated at Hereford Cathedral School
British pathologists
British naturalists
People from Hereford
People from Kemble, Gloucestershire